The Gypsy of Athens is a 1922 Greek silent drama film directed by Ahilleas Madras.  A gypsy falls in love with an American woman to the fury of his former lover.  It was a joint venture between Joseph Hepp and Ahilleas Madras.  Madras was a theater actor and eventually married the lead character from the film Gypsy of Athens Frida Poupelina.  Together they participated in the Viennese cinema.  Madras went off to create additional films such as Maria Pentagiotissa in 1927 and The Wizard of Athens in 1931.  The Wizard of Athens reused footage from the film Gypsy of Athens.  Regrettably, the original film Gypsy of Athens is a lost film. Luckily most of the film became The Wizard of Athens which was preserved.      

The film first premiered in Athens, Greece on 1 October 1922 and had limited distribution in Greece.  The film featured characters from the United States of America and was premiered mainly in New York, Massachusetts, Connecticut, Rhode Island, and Chicago. Madras filmed compelling footage of the Asia Minor catastrophe.  Some of his footage was exhibited with the film as news footage.  The footage featured The Commendation of the Americans,  Exchange of Prisoners, The Destruction of Smyrna and  The Tragic Exodus of the Refugees.

The film premiered on Broadway at the Times Square Theater on 20 April 1924 but it was heavily censored by the New York State Film Commission.  Some scenes were deemed indecent and inciting crime namely close-ups of a dance on a rock, shots of belly dancing, a girl falling from a cliff, Venus emerging from the ocean, and the theft of a neckless from a girl unconscious inside a car.  The scenes were cut in the U.S. version.    

The New York screenings of the five-act film featured the accompaniment of a 20-piece orchestra conducted by Lucianos Kavadias and a baritone named Belgarino sang the gypsy love song of Yar.  That same year, screenings continued across the United States throughout the Greek communities in Bridgeport, Connecticut, Providence, Rhode Island,  Boston, and Lowell Massachusetts.

Plot
The film features images of Ancient Greek sites and was filmed in parts of  Omonoia, Faliro, Elefsina, Kifissia and Syntagma Stadium.  An American woman named Smale travels to Greece with her wealthy father from Chicago.  Smale becomes enchanted with the country and decides to marry a Greek man. The story features images of the busy modern city of Athens in 1922.  Smale throws a party to find a husband.  One of the men plots to steal her neckless.  She is kidnapped and thrown over a cliff.  She is found by gypsies.  Smale becomes a gypsy woman and falls in love with a gypsy leader named Yor.  Yor is also a violinist and a singer.  She begins to live among the gypsies in a gypsy encampment.  Smale is lured by a wealthy industrialist and forgets about Yor.  Yor is involved with another woman who competes with Smale for his love.  Yor is banished from seeing Smale because of her rich industrialist husband.  Yor tells Smale and they meet on the beach and tragically drown.

The Gypsy of Athens vs. The Wizard of Athens
Most of the footage in the 1931 film The Wizard of Athens was taken from The Gypsy of Athens  released in 1922.  Madras rebranded his silent film with new intertitles changing the story around and introducing new footage.  Luckily for cinema historians The Gypsy of Athens can easily be found within the second film released nine years later.  Madras completely changed the story which was centered around a wizard instead of a gypsy.  The modernization of the two characters can be distinguished by the elaborate outfit worn by the wizard which is slightly different than the original gypsies wardrobe.  Madras was also ten years younger when they filmed the original movie.  Carefully observing both films, the two films can be separated, regrettably, the intertitles were completely changed and lost forever.

Cast
 Ahilleas Madras as Yor  
 Frida Poupelina as Smale

References

Bibliography

External links 
 

1922 films
1922 drama films
Greek silent films
Greek drama films
Films set in Athens
Films set in Greece
Greek-language films
Greek black-and-white films
Silent drama films